José Eulogio Bonilla Robles (born 25 January 1946) is a Mexican lawyer and politician affiliated with the Institutional Revolutionary Party. He served as Senator of the LVIII and LIX Legislatures of the Mexican Congress representing Zacatecas and as Deputy of the LV and LVII Legislatures. He was also a local deputy in the XLVI Legislature of the Congress of Zacatecas.

References

1946 births
Living people
Politicians from Fresnillo, Zacatecas
20th-century Mexican lawyers
Members of the Senate of the Republic (Mexico)
Members of the Chamber of Deputies (Mexico)
Members of the Congress of Zacatecas
Institutional Revolutionary Party politicians
20th-century Mexican politicians
21st-century Mexican politicians
21st-century Mexican lawyers